James Sherlock (born Rudgwick, West Sussex) is a musician of British and Irish ancestry.

Born in Sussex, Sherlock studied with Kevin Smith, continuing at Chetham's School of Music in Manchester and Eton College.  He read music at Trinity College, Cambridge, where he was organ scholar.  He continued music studies at the Guildhall School of Music & Drama with Joan Havill and Conducting at the Sibelius Academy.

Professionally, Sherlock has conducted the English Chamber Orchestra and BBC Concert Orchestra, and appeared with the London Philharmonic Orchestra as organist.  He has accompanied numerous international vocal artists. His Carnegie Hall debut was in January 2014.

In November 2016, Sherlock was the victim of a street attack in London.  The injuries from the assault required reconstructive facial surgery.

Discography
Chamber Music by David Earl, (International Piano, runner up Best New Disk of 2007)
Fauré: Requiem, with the London Symphony Orchestra, (Gramophone Editor's choice)
Rachmaninov Symphonic Dances for two pianos (with Graeme Mitchison)
Poulenc: Figure humaine and other choral works, with Tenebrae choir
What Sweeter Music: Music for Christmas, with Tenebrae choir
'The Call of Wisdom': music of Will Todd, with Tenebrae choir
Complete Choral Works of Benjamin Britten, with the NYCGB
'Incarnation': works by Thomas Hewitt-Jones

References

External links

 Trinity College Choir, Current and Former Organ Scholars
 Hampstead Arts Festival, '60 seconds with ... James Sherlock'
 Just Giving crowd-funding page for James Sherlock
 Hyperion Records page and discography on James Sherlock
 Gloucester Music Society, News and Reviews, 2016/2017 season

Living people
1983 births
People educated at Eton College
People educated at Chetham's School of Music
Alumni of Trinity College, Cambridge
British classical pianists
Male classical pianists
British male conductors (music)
21st-century British conductors (music)
21st-century classical pianists
21st-century British male musicians
People from Rudgwick